African Church may refer to:

Early African church, Christian communities inhabiting Roman Africa
The African Church, a Christian denomination in Nigeria
African Church (St. Charles, Missouri), U.S., a historic African Methodist Episcopal church
 African Episcopal Church of St. Thomas, Philadelphia, U.S.
 State Street AME Zion Church, founded as the African Church of the City of Mobile, Alabama, U.S.

See also
Christianity in Africa
African Methodist Episcopal Church